Mulhid (plural   and  ) is an Islamic religious term meaning apostate, heretic, or atheist. In pre-Islamic times the term was used in the literal sense of the root l-ḥ-d: "incline, deviate". Its religious meaning is based on the Quranic verses 7:180, 22:25, and 41:40. Under the Umayyad Caliphate it denoted desertion of the ummah and rebellion against legitimate caliphs. Early in the Abbasid era rationalistic theologians began using it in the sense of "heretic", and it eventually came to refer to rejection of religion as such, to materialistic scepticism and atheism. In Ottoman usage the term was commonly used in reference to Shia and certain Sufi doctrines that were considered to be subversive.

References

See also
Irreligion
Atheism
Zindiq

Atheism
Islam and other religions
Islam-related slurs
Islamic belief and doctrine
Islamic terminology
Heresy